Darrell W. Krueger Library, commonly known as Krueger Library, is the center of research, discovery, and creative output at Winona State University (WSU). The library serves more than 10,000 students, faculty, and staff in the WSU community, residents in the city of Winona, Minnesota, and the greater Southeastern Minnesota region. It is a United States Federal depository library.

Library History

Before 1999, Maxwell Library (now Maxwell Hall) served students in the historic core of campus that surrounds Somsen Hall. When the WSU community celebrated the completion of the "New Library" situated on the opposite side of campus, then-president Darrell W. Krueger spoke and then-governor Jesse Ventura was in attendance. It was built with the "Laptop University" in mind, with over 1,800 network ports, wireless internet access, and over ten high speed duplexing laser printers throughout the building.

The library has honored retired WSU President Darrell W. Krueger since spring 2005.

Building Construction and Library Services

The library has three floors with over 250,000 books and e-books, thousands of periodical titles, and over 140 online databases. The library offers: public terminals for internet access and printing; research computers with access to the catalog; and WSU database access to anyone in the library building; forty-two high end multimedia computer towers, both Macintosh and PC platforms are supported.  Users can borrow laptops, power and network cords, webcams, media carts which include a wide screen TV and DVD/VCR, and webcams (for WSU students only).  It also has six laptop workstations for scanning. Students can study and work on group projects in study room located on all three floors of the building.

Library Athenaeum
The Athenaeum hosts events that explore and enhance the intellectual life of the University and the region. These events could include lectures, readings, discussions, seminars, performance arts, and other educational experiences.

By bringing together scholars, performing artists, students, community members, and other interested people for intellectual discussion and the sharing of cultural experiences, the Athenaeum reflects the importance the University places on the humanities, the arts, and the sciences.

In 2016, the Athenaeum became a podcast. The Athenaeum ended in 2018. More information and podcast recordings are found in WSU Library's OpenRiver Digital Repository.

References

External links
Darrell W. Krueger Library home page
Contact a librarian at Winona State University
Library Contact Information
WSU Library Athenaeum - The Athenaeum lecture series is on hiatus,
 WSU Tutoring Services

University and college academic libraries in the United States
Libraries in Minnesota
Winona State University
Library buildings completed in 1999
Buildings and structures in Winona, Minnesota
1999 establishments in Minnesota